Jefferson County (county code JF) is a county located in the U.S. state of Kansas. At the 2020 census, the county population was 18,368. Its county seat and most populous city is Oskaloosa.

History

Early history

For many millennia, the Great Plains of North America was inhabited by nomadic Native Americans.  From the 16th century to 18th century, the Kingdom of France claimed ownership of large parts of North America.  In 1762, after the French and Indian War, France secretly ceded New France to Spain, per the Treaty of Fontainebleau.

19th century
In 1802, Spain returned most of the land to France, but keeping title to about 7,500 square miles.  In 1803, most of the land for modern day Kansas was acquired by the United States from France as part of the 828,000 square mile Louisiana Purchase for 2.83 cents per acre.

In 1854, the Kansas Territory was organized, then in 1861 Kansas became the 34th U.S. state.  In 1855, Jefferson County was established, and was named for President Thomas Jefferson.  Settlement of the county was slowed by events prior to and during the Civil War, but the present day unincorporated community of Thompsonville (3 miles northwest of Perry on the Delaware River) was the first established in 1851 by Mormon settlers who initially refused to accompany the main group led by Brigham Young to the Salt Lake Valley.  The settlement was first abandoned due to the violence resulting from the border wars, but was re-established when the Civil War ended.

Geography

Adjacent counties
 Atchison County (north)
 Leavenworth County (east)
 Douglas County (south)
 Shawnee County (southwest)
 Jackson County (northwest)

Demographics

Jefferson County is included in the Topeka, KS Metropolitan Statistical Area.

At the 2000 Census, there were 18,426 people, 6,830 households and 5,190 families residing in the county. There were 7,491 housing units at an average density of 14 per square mile (5/km2). The racial makeup of the county was 96.70% White, 0.92% Native American, 0.37% Black or African American, 0.17% Asian, 0.01% Pacific Islander, 0.42% from other races, and 1.41% from two or more races. Hispanic or Latino of any race were 1.28% of the population.

There were 6,830 households, of which 35.70% had children under the age of 18 living with them, 65.20% were married couples living together, 7.00% had a female householder with no husband present, and 24.00% were non-families. 20.10% of all households were made up of individuals, and 9.30% had someone living alone who was 65 years of age or older. The average household size was 2.66 and the average family size was 3.07.

27.40% of the population were under the age of 18, 7.00% from 18 to 24, 28.00% from 25 to 44, 24.90% from 45 to 64, and 12.80% who were 65 years of age or older. The median age was 38 years. For every 100 females, there were 102.60 males. For every 100 females age 18 and over, there were 98.90 males.

The median household income was $45,535 and the median family income was $50,557. Males had a median income of $36,174 compared with $25,468 for females. The per capita income for the county was $19,373. About 5.30% of families and 6.70% of the population were below the poverty line, including 6.90% of those under age 18 and 7.70% of those age 65 or over.

Government

Presidential elections

Like all of Kansas outside the eastern cities, Jefferson County is a Republican stronghold, having not been won by a Democrat since Franklin D. Roosevelt’s 1932 landslide – although it was one of three Kansas counties to give a plurality to Ross Perot in 1992.

Laws
Jefferson County was a prohibition, or "dry", county until the Kansas Constitution was amended in 1986 and voters approved the sale of alcoholic liquor by the individual drink with a 30% food sales requirement.

The county voted "No" on the 2022 Kansas Value Them Both Amendment, an anti-abortion ballot measure, by 55% to 45% despite backing Donald Trump with 65% of the vote to Joe Biden's 33% in the 2020 presidential election.

Media 
Jefferson County has two newspapers which are still in operation, The Oskaloosa Independent and The Valley Falls Vindicator. Both of which are owned by Davis Publications. Together, the two papers cover the happenings of Jefferson County and its townships. The editor for both papers is Holly Allen.

Education

Unified school districts
 Valley Falls USD 338
 Jefferson County North USD 339
 Jefferson West USD 340
 Oskaloosa USD 341
 McLouth USD 342
 Perry-Lecompton USD 343

Communities

Cities

 McLouth
 Meriden
 Nortonville
 Oskaloosa (county seat) 
 Ozawkie
 Perry
 Valley Falls
 Winchester

Census-designated place
 Grantville

Other unincorporated communities

 Boyle
 Buck Creek
 Dunavant
 Lakeside Village
 Half Mound
 Indian Ridge
 Lake Shore
 Medina
 Mooney Creek
 Newman
 Rock Creek
 Thompsonville
 West Shore
 Williamstown

Townships
Jefferson County is divided into twelve townships. None of the cities within the county are considered governmentally independent, and all figures for the townships include those of the cities. In the following table, the population center is the largest city (or cities) included in that township's population total, if it is of a significant size.

Notable people
 Roger Barker (1903-1990), American environmental psychologist
 John Curry (1897–1946), painter
 Mary Lowman (1842-1912), first woman in Kansas to be elected mayor with a city council composed entirely of women.
 Charles Roberts (1936-), American politician

See also

References

Notes

Further reading

 Standard Atlas of Jefferson County, Kansas; Geo. A. Ogle & Co; 69 pages; 1916.
 Descriptive Atlas of Jefferson County, Kansas; Acme Publishing Co; 44 pages; 1899.

External links

County
 
 Jefferson County - Directory of Public Officials
Maps
 Jefferson County Maps: Current, Historic, KDOT
 Kansas Highway Maps: Current, Historic, KDOT
 Kansas Railroad Maps: Current, 1996, 1915, KDOT and Kansas Historical Society

 
1855 establishments in Kansas Territory
Kansas counties
Topeka metropolitan area, Kansas